The Cabmen's Shelter Fund was established in London, England, in 1875 to run shelters for the drivers of hansom cabs and later hackney carriages (taxicabs).

By law, cab drivers could not leave the cab stand while their cab was parked there. This made it very difficult for them to obtain hot meals and could be unpleasant in bad weather. If they drove to a pub to buy food then they would have to pay somebody to look after their cab while they were inside, otherwise it was likely to be stolen. In addition they would be tempted to drink alcohol on the job. Newspaper editor George Armstrong and The Earl of Shaftesbury took it upon themselves to set up a charity to construct and run shelters at major cab stands. The idea allegedly came to Armstrong when all the cabbies seeking a pub's refuge and warmth on a snowy night in St John's Wood rendered him unable to hire a taxi there.

These shelters were small green huts, which were not allowed to be larger than a horse and cart, as they stood on the public highway. Between 1875 and 1914, 61 of these buildings were built around London, the first being on Acacia Road in St John's Wood near Armstrong's home. Most were staffed by an attendant who sold food and (non-alcoholic) drink to the cabbies and were provided with a kitchen in which the attendant could cook this food and also food provided by the cabbies themselves. The attendant was not generally paid, but was expected to make an income from these sales. The shelters were also provided with seats and tables and books and newspapers, most of them donated by the publishers or other benefactors. Most could accommodate ten to thirteen men. Gambling, drinking and swearing were strictly forbidden.

Thirteen of the shelters still exist and are still run by the Cabmen's Shelter Fund. All are now Grade II listed buildings. They are located at:

 Chelsea Embankment SW3 – close to its junction with Albert Bridge, London
 Embankment Place WC2 – close to the Playhouse Theatre
 Grosvenor Gardens SW1 – to the west side of the north gardens
 Hanover Square, London W1 – on the north side of the central gardens
 Kensington Park Road W11 – outside numbers 8–10
 Kensington Road W8 – close to the junction of Queen's Gate SW7
 Pont Street SW1 – close to the junction of Sloane Street
 Russell Square WC1 – Western Corner (relocated to here from Leicester Square)
 St. George's Square, Pimlico SW1 – on the north side
 Temple Place WC2 – opposite side of the road from the Swissötel Howard
 Thurloe Place, Kensington SW7 – in the middle of the road, east of the entrance to the Victoria and Albert Museum
 Warwick Avenue, London W9 – centre of the road, by Warwick Avenue Underground station
 Wellington Place NW8 – near to Lord's Cricket Ground

During annual Open House London Heritage Days, the public gets a chance to see inside some of the shelters, normally the exclusive reserve of cab drivers.

References

External links

 
 "The Cabmen's Shelters: Inside London's secret 'green sheds at BBC News

1875 establishments in England
Organizations established in 1875
Grade II listed buildings in London
Social welfare charities based in the United Kingdom
Taxis of London